Culture of Corruption: Obama and His Team of Tax Cheats, Crooks, and Cronies is a book written by conservative author Michelle Malkin. The book claims that the Barack Obama administration has had dozens of instances of corruption.  The title is a reference to "culture of corruption", a political slogan used by Democrats to refer to events that happened during the presidency of George W. Bush.

The book spent six weeks at #1 on the hardcover non-fiction section of the New York Times Best Seller list.

In August 2010, an updated paperback edition with three new chapters was published.

Reception

Steve Almond of Salon Magazine gave the book an unfavorable review, describing it as a "transparently mercenary clip job patched together via large doses of Red Bull and Google."

Michael Gaynor of Renew America wrote, "The Far Left finds Ms. Malkin far too formidable and thus reflexively resorts to baseless personal attacks against her because they can't refute her on the facts and don't want people paying attention to her."

References

External links
Full text available at Internet Archive
Excerpt
Book tour interview with Sean Hannity

Books critical of modern liberalism in the United States
Regnery Publishing books
Books about Barack Obama
2009 non-fiction books
American political books
Books by Michelle Malkin